The Southside Historic District in Valdosta, Georgia is a  historic district that was listed on the National Register of Historic Places in 2007.

The neighborhood developed as an African-American area.  The district included 421 contributing buildings, two other contributing structures, and 283 non-contributing buildings.

References

Historic districts on the National Register of Historic Places in Georgia (U.S. state)
Art Deco architecture in Georgia (U.S. state)
Buildings and structures completed in 1874
National Register of Historic Places in Lowndes County, Georgia